Zlatkov is a surname derived from a masculine given name Zlatko. Notable people with the surname include:

 Daniel Zlatkov (born 1989), Bulgarian footballer
 Petar Zlatkov (born 1984), Bulgarian footballer

Bulgarian-language surnames